Peter Taylor Mercado Nazareno (born 1 December 1981) is an Ecuadorian former footballer who is last known to have played as a defender or midfielder for Deportivo Quito.

Career

Mercado started his career with Montenegro Fútbol Club in the Ecuadorian lower leagues, before joining Vorskla through Dragan Draskovic, the son of former Ecuador national team manager Dušan Drašković, where he became the first Ecuadorian to play in Ukraine and made 29 league appearances and scored 0 goals. After that, Mercado signed for Ukrainian club Kryvbas.

References

External links
 
 

Ecuadorian footballers
Living people
Expatriate footballers in Ukraine
Ecuadorian expatriate footballers
Ecuadorian expatriate sportspeople in Ukraine
Ukrainian Premier League players
1981 births
FC Vorskla Poltava players
Association football defenders
FC Kryvbas Kryvyi Rih players
Association football midfielders